Abe Minderts Lenstra (27 November 19202 September 1985) was a Dutch footballer and national football icon in the 1950s who played as a forward. He is regarded as one of the greatest players ever to hail from the Netherlands. He was also a Frisian legend, most notably with the club where he made his name as a football player, Heerenveen.

Career
Lenstra played for a host of clubs such as SC Enschede, Enschedese Boys, PH: DOS '19, WSV, DOS Kampen and vv LTC. However, it was with VV Heerenveen (the previous name of current day sc Heerenveen) where he first was selected for the Dutch national team. When in 1954 professional football was introduced in the Netherlands the already 34-year-old Abe Lenstra moved from VV Heerenveen to the bigger SC Enschede. It was in Enschede where he missed his best chance of ever winning the Dutch title: in 1958 SC Enschede lost the first and last Eredivisie final ever after 180 minutes from DOS Utrecht. In 1960, he made the move to the rivals Enschedese Boys, where he ended his professional career in 1963.

With the national team, for which he played a total of 47 caps scoring 33 goals, he struck a partnership with other internationals such as Faas Wilkes and Kees Rijvers. He was known to stand by his principles and objected to play for the national squad if he was not selected for the position he favoured.

It was Lenstra who put the name of sc Heerenveen on the footballing map, where the club was also fondly referred to as 'Abeveen'. In 1977, long after he retired from football, he was diagnosed with having a brain haemorrhage and spent the remainder of his life using a wheelchair. He died in 1985, just a few days before the first ever international match in the stadium that a year later would bear his name.

Career statistics

Legacy
Today, his name has been closely associated with sc Heerenveen and its stadium: The (first and second) Abe Lenstra Stadion has been named in his honour as a lasting memorial.

Honours 
Heerenveen
 Northern First Division: 1941–42, 1942–43, 1943–44, 1945–46, 1946–47, 1947–48, 1948–49, 1949–50, 1950–51
 Netherlands Football League Championship Runner-up: 1946–47, 1947–48

SC Enschede
Eredivisie Runner-up: 1957–58

Individual
 Netherlands national team all-time top scorer: 1958–1959
 Dutch Sportsman of the Year: 1951, 1952
 Netherlands Football League Championship top scorer: 1946–47, 1947–48

External links
Abe Lenstra at sc Heerenveen official website

See also 
 List of men's footballers with 500 or more goals

References 
Yme Kuiper, 'Abe Lenstra (1920–1985). Van Us Abe tot nationaal idool,' in: Fryslân, Nieuwsblad voor geschiedenis en cultuur, jg. 6 (2000), nr. 2, pp. 50–53. Online site

1920 births
1985 deaths
Dutch footballers
Association football forwards
Netherlands international footballers
Olympic footballers of the Netherlands
Footballers at the 1948 Summer Olympics
Footballers from Friesland
Sportspeople from Heerenveen
SC Heerenveen players
Sportclub Enschede players
Eredivisie players
20th-century Dutch people